Častolovice is a market town in Rychnov nad Kněžnou District in the Hradec Králové Region of the Czech Republic. It has about 1,700 inhabitants.

Geography
It lies in the Orlice Table. It is situated on the Bělá River, near its confluence with the Divoká Orlice. The Divoká Orlice forms the southern municipal border.

History

Around 1280, a Gothic fortress was built here by a noble family, later named Lords of Častolovice. The first written mention of Častolovice is from 1342, when the village was promoted to a market town by John of Bohemia. Between 1588 and 1615, the fortress was rebuilt into a Renaissance castle. From 1694 until the World War II, Častolovice was owned by the Sternberg family. In 1992, the castle was returned to the family.

Sights
The main sight of Častolovice is the Častolovice Castle. The castle is open to the public and includes a mini-zoo and an English park with a game park.

The Church of Saint Vitus is a Baroque building. It replaced an old Gothic church first mentioned in 1356. Some elements of the original church are preserved in the present building.

Notable people
Jiří Pelikán (1906–1984), chess player

References

External links

Častolovice Castle

Populated places in Rychnov nad Kněžnou District
Market towns in the Czech Republic
Sternberg family